Poston Camp is an Iron Age hill fort located just south of Vowchurch, Herefordshire.

Further reading
Children, G; Nash, G (1994) Prehistoric Sites of Herefordshire Logaston Press 

Hill forts in Herefordshire